The Sneathiellaceae are a family of bacteria.

References

Alphaproteobacteria